This is a list of diseases starting with the letter "J".

Ja–Je
 Jackson–Weiss syndrome
 Jacobsen syndrome
 Jadassohn–Lewandowsky syndrome
 Jaffer–Beighton syndrome
 Jalili syndrome
 Jancar syndrome
 Jankovic–Rivera syndrome
 Jansen type metaphyseal chondrodysplasia
 Jansky–Bielschowsky disease
 Japanese encephalitis
 Jarcho–Levin syndrome
 Jejunal atresia
 Jensen syndrome
 Jequier–Kozlowski skeletal dysplasia
 Jervell and Lange-Nielsen syndrome
 Jeune syndrome situs inversus
 Jeune syndrome
 Jeune asphyxiating thoracic dystrophy

Jo
 Job syndrome
 Johanson–Blizzard syndrome
 Johnson–Hall–Krous syndrome
 Johnson–Munson syndrome
 Johnston–Aarons–Schelley syndrome
 Jones–Hersh–Yusk syndrome
 Jones syndrome
 Jorgenson–Lenz syndrome
 Joseph disease
 Joubert syndrome bilateral chorioretinal coloboma
 Joubert syndrome

Ju
 Juberg–Hayward syndrome
 Juberg–Marsidi syndrome
 Judge–Misch–Wright syndrome
 Jumping Frenchmen of Maine
 Jung–Wolff–Back–Stahl syndrome
 Juvenile cataract cerebellar atrophy myopathy mental retardation
 Juvenile dermatomyositis
 Juvenile gastrointestinal polyposis
 Juvenile gout
 Juvenile hyaline fibromatosis
 Juvenile macular degeneration hypotrichosis
 Juvenile muscular atrophy of the distal upper limb
 Juvenile myoclonic epilepsy
 Juvenile nephronophthisis
 Juvenile rheumatoid arthritis
 Juvenile temporal arteritis
 Juliannite nephronophthisis

J